Tattva vision is a technique developed by the Hermetic Order of the Golden Dawn to aid with the development of the faculty of astral clairvoyance. They were derived from the elements or tattvas of Hindu philosophy and the Vedantic doctrine of pancikarana, as interpreted by the Golden Dawn.

Tattva symbols 
The astral forms of the tattvas and equivalent in Western elements:

Constructing tattva cards 
Tattva cards can be constructed by cutting the tattva symbols out of coloured paper or card, and pasting on to small cards of about 6 inches by 6 inches in size. Alternatively the tattva symbols may be painted onto the cards, or a commercial set of cards may be obtained.

See also 

 Zener cards
 Remote viewing
 Subtle body

References

Bibliography 

 Fletcher, Ella A., Law of the Rhythmic Breath: Teaching the Generation, Conservation, and Control of Vital Force (Kessinger, 1997) 
 Mumford, John, Magical Tattwa Cards (Llewellyn, 1997) 
 Prasad, Rama, Nature's Finer Forces: The Science of Breath and the Philosophy of the Tattvas (Kessinger, 1997) 
 Ramacharaka Yogi, Science of Breath (Kessinger, 1997)

External links 
 An Introduction to Tattvas
 Open Source Order of the Golden Dawn Various Flying Rolls on Tattva usage

Divination
Hermetic Order of the Golden Dawn